This is a complete episode listing for the anime series Ceres, Celestial Legend. Directed by Hajime Kamegaki and produced by Studio Pierrot, the twenty-four episode series is based on the fourteen volume manga series written and illustrated by Yuu Watase. In Ceres, Celestial Legend, Aya Mikage finds her world turned upside on her 16th birthday, when her family suddenly tries to kill her, her twin brother is taken away, and her father is killed. Aya learns she is the reincarnation of Ceres, a celestial maiden seeking her  and revenge on the Mikage for keeping her trapped in this world for so many centuries. As Aya seeks the robe, another branch of the Mikage family pursues her to capture Ceres for their own gain. The series premiered in Japan on WOWOW on 20 April 2000 and concluded on 28 September 2000. It was released to VHS videotape and DVD by Bandai Visual in twelve volumes, with each volume containing two episodes.

Ceres, Celestial Legend is licensed for Region 1 release by Viz Media, which also owns the North American license for the source manga. Viz released the series to VHS and DVD in eight three-episode volumes, with the first volume released on 24 July 2001. The VHS editions were dubbed in English, while the DVD volumes offered a choice between the dubbed English audio track and the original Japanese audio, with optional English subtitles. The DVD versions also offers extra features, including art galleries, character profiles, and interviews with Yu Watase. In 2003, Viz re-released the series in two volume collector's edition sets that contained twelve episodes on two disc, and all of the on-disc extras from the earlier releases. The English dubbed version of the series were broadcast in Southeast Asia by AXN-Asia.

Four pieces of theme music are used in the series. The opening theme, "Scarlet" is performed by Junko Iwao and used to open all twenty-four episodes. A remixed version of the song is also used as the closing theme for the final episode.  For the first fifteen episodes, the song "One ~ Kono Yo ga Hatete mo Hanarenai" is used for the ending theme, while episodes sixteen through twenty-three use "Cross My Heart".  Both songs are performed by Day-break.



Episodes

References
General
 

Specific

Ceres, Celestial Legend